Warren Town Hall is a historic town hall in Warren, Massachusetts. The Renaissance Revival structure was built in 1900 to a design by Henry Hyde Dwight. The previous town hall, an 1879 Richardsonian Romanesque building was heavily damaged by fire, and its shell formed part of the framework for the new building. The old building's north tower was completely rebuilt, and the building's interior was completely new. The main entrance is sheltered by a portico supported by six Doric columns.

The building was listed on the National Register of Historic Places in 2001.

See also
National Register of Historic Places listings in Worcester County, Massachusetts

References

Government buildings completed in 1900
City and town halls on the National Register of Historic Places in Massachusetts
Buildings and structures in Worcester County, Massachusetts
Town halls in Massachusetts
National Register of Historic Places in Worcester County, Massachusetts